Mfumte (Nfumte) is a Grassfields Bantu language of Cameroon. It is not clear if the four varieties spoken by ethnic Mfumte—Ndaktup, Kwaja, Fum and Mfumte proper—are mutually intelligible or distinct languages; ability to communicate may be either due to inherent intelligibility or to bilingualism, while Fum and Mfumte may simply be the Nigerian and Cameroonian names for the same language.

Orthography 

The mfumte alphabet has 40 letters, with 30 consonants and 10 vowels.

References

External links 

 A Sketch Grammar of the Central Mfumte Language An introduction to the Mfumte language and a description of its grammar rules
 Conflict Resolution Systems in Wulí’ Culture A description of language conflict including the Mfumte language

Languages of Cameroon
Nkambe languages